Gerald Colin McKellar (29 May 1903 – 13 April 1970) was an Australian politician. He was a member of the Country Party and served as a Senator for New South Wales from 1958 until his death in 1970. He was Minister for Repatriation from 1964 to 1969.

Early life
McKellar was born in Gulgong, New South Wales and educated at Gilgandra and became a wheat and sheep farmer in the Gilgandra area. He married Florence Emily Smith in 1926. He commanded the local militia from 1936 and was appointed a major in the second Australian Imperial Force in September 1942. He was transferred to the reserves in April 1946. After World War II, he became an official in several farming organisations.

Political career

McKellar was elected as a Country Party Senator at the 1958 election. In December 1964, he was appointed Minister for Repatriation. He was obliged to implement Cabinet's decision to cut costs despite the strenuous opposition of the Returned Services League. During the Holt government, he also came under strong pressure over the VIP flights affair as he represented the Minister for Air Peter Howson in the Senate. He agreed not to be appointed to the second Gorton Ministry in November 1969, on grounds of ill-health and five months later died of coronary heart disease, survived by his wife and three sons.

The Canberra suburb of McKellar was named after him in 1974.

References

National Party of Australia members of the Parliament of Australia
Members of the Australian Senate for New South Wales
Members of the Australian Senate
1903 births
1970 deaths
20th-century Australian politicians
Australian military personnel of World War II